is a former Japanese badminton player who affiliated with Sanko Co, Ltd. Igawa competed at the 2000 Summer Olympics in Sydney, Australia in the women's doubles partnered with Hiroko Nagamine. Igawa started her badminton career when she was in grade 4 elementary school. She won the division two All Japan Junior Championships when she was in middle school. Before joining Sanko team, she was part of the NTT Tokyo team. Her best rank was in 17 position in the women's doubles event.

Achievements

IBF International
Women's doubles

References

External links
 
 
 

1978 births
Living people
Sportspeople from Ibaraki Prefecture
Japanese female badminton players
Olympic badminton players of Japan
Badminton players at the 2000 Summer Olympics
21st-century Japanese women